Nicholas Tower, situated on Independence Square, Port of Spain, Trinidad and Tobago is the fifth tallest building in Trinidad and Tobago. It has an elliptical floor plate and stands 21 floors tall and 88 Meters high. Construction was completed in 2003 and each floor,  of space, was rented out at a cost of $96,000 a month (as of 2005). It is a blue glass tower.

The building was constructed on the site of the Trinidad Union Club, a 136-year-old private club., which occupied the penthouse suite of the Nicholas Tower until 2015.  Currently major tenants of Nicholas Tower include:
The Trinidad and Tobago Stock Exchange, a former tenant of the old Union Club building
Caribbean Airlines (The national airline of Trinidad and Tobago)
American Airlines
Continental Airlines
Ministry of Trade and Industry
Ministry of Community Development, Culture and the Arts
Office of the Prime Minister
InvesTT
Economic Diversification Board (EDB) of the Ministry of Planning
 Flow

References

External links

Buildings and structures in Port of Spain
Skyscrapers in Trinidad and Tobago
Skyscraper office buildings
Office buildings completed in 2003